Kramgoa låtar 17 is a 1989 studio album by Vikingarna.

Track listing
Speleman
En vissnad blomma
Melodien
Jag ville bara krama dej
Mest av allt
Sista natten med gänget
Sitter i regnet
Spinnrocken
Tre röda rosor
Vill du och kan du så får du
Piccolissima Serenata
Lev som du lär
Innan tåget ska gå
Gran Canaria
Vikingablod

Chart positions

References 

1989 albums
Vikingarna (band) albums
Swedish-language albums